Polyanka:
 Bolshaya Polyanka
 Malaya Polyanka
 Polyanka (Moscow Metro)
 Polyanka (Belarus)
 Novaya Polyanka (Udmurtia)

See also 
 Gmina Polanka Wielka